First Polish encyclopedias date to the 17th century.

Polish encyclopedias have been traditionally characterized by succinct definitions.

See also 

 Polish dictionaries

References